This is a list of the first women lawyer(s) and judge(s) in Vermont. It includes the year in which the women were admitted to practice law (in parentheses). Also included are women who achieved other distinctions such becoming the first in their state to graduate from law school or become a political figure.

Firsts in Vermont's history

Lawyers 

First female: Jessie Bigwood (1902) 
First female to practice before the Vermont Supreme Court: Consuelo N. Bailey (1925) in 1926 
First female to independently try and win a murder case: Consuelo N. Bailey (1925) in 1929

State judges 

 First female (justice of the peace): Beatrice Y. Brown (1922) 
 First female (probate court): Mary Adams (1926) from 1928-1949 
 First female (trial court): Grace Johnson Murphy McGuire (1940) in 1965 
 First female (state-level trial court): Linda Levitt (1975) in 1984 
First female (environmental): Merideth Wright in 1990 
First female (Supreme Court of Vermont): Denise R. Johnson (1980) in 1990 
First openly lesbian female (Supreme Court of Vermont): Beth Robinson (1989) in 2011 
First female to judicially serve the same time as her spouse: Kirstin Schoonover in 2015 

First woman of color (Chinese descent) (Supreme Court of Vermont): Nancy Waples in 2022

Federal judges 
First female (U.S. District Court for the District of Vermont): Christina Reiss (1980) in 2009 
First openly lesbian female (U.S. Court of Appeals for the Second Circuit in Vermont): Beth Robinson (1989) in 2021

Attorney General of Vermont 

 First female: Charity Clark in 2022

Assistant Attorney General 

 First female: Georgiana Miranda around 1972

State's Attorney 

First female: Consuelo N. Bailey (1925) in 1927

United States Attorney 

 First female (acting): Eugenia Cowles in 2014 
First female (permanent): Christina E. Nolan in 2017

Political Office 

 First female (Lieutenant Governor): Consuelo N. Bailey (1925) in 1955

Vermont Bar Association 

 First female (president): Ellen Mercer Fallon (1977) from 1987-1988

Firsts in local history 
 Beatrice Y. Brown (1922): First female lawyer in Southern Vermont
 Madeline Cecelia Wood: First female probate judge in Addison County, Vermont (1938)
 Mary Adams (1926): First female probate judge in Bennington County, Vermont (1928–1949)
 Consuelo N. Bailey (1925): First female State's Attorney in Chittenden County, Vermont (1927)

See also  

 List of first women lawyers and judges in the United States
 Timeline of women lawyers in the United States
 Women in law

Other topics of interest 

 List of first minority male lawyers and judges in the United States
 List of first minority male lawyers and judges in Vermont

References 

Lawyers, Vermont, first
Vermont, first
Women, Vermont, first
Women, Vermont, first
Women in Vermont
Lawyers and judges
Vermont lawyers